Noyant-la-Gravoyère is a former commune in the Maine-et-Loire department in western France. On 15 December 2016, it was merged into the new commune Segré-en-Anjou Bleu. Its population was 1,869 in 2019, down from 1,961 in 1962.

Geography
The river Verzée forms part of the commune's southern border.

See also
Communes of the Maine-et-Loire department

References

Noyantlagravoyere